Conus circumactus is a species of sea snail, a marine gastropod mollusk in the family Conidae, the cone snails and their allies.

Like all species within the genus Conus, these snails are predatory and venomous. They are capable of "stinging" humans, therefore live ones should be handled carefully or not at all.

Description
The size of an adult shell varies between 35 mm and 75 mm. The smooth shell is rather thin. The spire is low-conical and contains revolving striae, usually maculated with chestnut. The body whorl is striate below. The color of the shell is yellowish or light chestnut, with large white blotches forming a band at the shoulder and another on the middle, encircled by narrow chestnut lines, which are often broken up into small dots . The color of the base and the aperture is usually violaceous. In Conus cinctus, Swainson 1822, the narrow chestnut lines are continuous, the white blotches and interior of aperture are more or less suffused with rose-color.

Distribution
This species occurs in the tropical Indo-Pacific and off Australia (Queensland)

References

  Swainson, W. 1822. Zoological Illustrations; or Original Figures and Descriptions of new, rare, or interesting Animals, selected chiefly from the classes of Ornithology, Entomology, and Conchology, and arranged on the principles of Cuvier and other modern zoologists. Series 1. London : Baldwin, Cradock & Joy Vol. 3 pls 84–134.
 Adams, A. 1855. Description of thirty-nine new species of shells, from the collection of Hugh Cuming. Proceedings of the Zoological Society of London 1854(22): 130–138, pl. 28
 Odhner, N.H. 1917. Results of Dr E. Mjöbergs Swedish scientific expeditions to Australia. 1910–1913, pt XVII, Mollusca. Kongliga Svenska Vetenskaps-Academiens Nya Handlingar, Stockholm 52(16): 1–115 pls 1–3 
 Iredale, T. 1929. Queensland molluscan notes, No. 1. Memoirs of the Queensland Museum 9(3): 261–297, pls 30–31
 Bartsch, P. & Rehder, H.A. 1943. New cones from the Hawaiian Islands. Proceedings of the Biological Society of Washington 56: 85–88
 Hinton, A. 1972. Shells of New Guinea and the Central Indo-Pacific. Milton : Jacaranda Press xviii 94 pp.
 Cernohorsky, W.O. 1978. Tropical Pacific Marine Shells. Sydney : Pacific Publications 352 pp., 68 pls.
 Kay, E.A. 1979. Hawaiian Marine Shells. Reef and shore fauna of Hawaii. Section 4 : Mollusca. Honolulu, Hawaii : Bishop Museum Press Bernice P. Bishop Museum Special Publication Vol. 64(4) 653 pp
 Wilson, B. 1994. Australian Marine Shells. Prosobranch Gastropods. Kallaroo, WA : Odyssey Publishing Vol. 2 370 pp.
 Röckel, D., Korn, W. & Kohn, A.J. 1995. Manual of the Living Conidae. Volume 1: Indo-Pacific Region. Wiesbaden : Hemmen 517 pp..
 Severns, M. (2011). Shells of the Hawaiian Islands – The Sea Shells. Conchbooks, Hackenheim. 564 pp.
 Tucker J.K. & Tenorio M.J. (2013) Illustrated catalog of the living cone shells. 517 pp. Wellington, Florida: MdM Publishing. 
 Puillandre N., Duda T.F., Meyer C., Olivera B.M. & Bouchet P. (2015). One, four or 100 genera? A new classification of the cone snails. Journal of Molluscan Studies. 81: 1–23

External links
 The Conus Biodiversity website
 
 Cone Shells – Knights of the Sea

circumactus
Gastropods described in 1929